Crypsicharis triplaca is a moth in the family Xyloryctidae. It was described by Oswald Bertram Lower in 1923. It is found in Australia, where it has been recorded from New South Wales and Queensland.

The wingspan is about 22 mm. The forewings are white, with fuscous markings and with a moderate somewhat-ovoid spot above the dorsum on the fold, in the middle. There is an erect, moderately thick, fascia-like streak, from the dorsum before the tornus, reaching three-quarters across the wing, the upper half divided into two roundish spots. The hindwings are grey whitish.

References

Xyloryctidae
Moths described in 1923